Şubanı (also, Shubany) is a settlement in Baku, Azerbaijan. The settlement forms part of the municipality of Lokbatan in Garadagh raion.

References 

Populated places in Baku